Shatzal (also Romanized as Shaţz̧al and Shaţzal; also known as Shaşt Zāl, Shast Zall, and Shaţţ Z̄al Sha‘bān) is a village in Khezel-e Sharqi Rural District, Khezel District, Nahavand County, Hamadan Province, Iran. At the 2006 census, its population was 102, in 23 families.

References 

Populated places in Nahavand County